Todd Pratzner (born August 10, 1994) is an American soccer player who plays as a defender.

Career
Pratzner played four years of college soccer at Xavier University between 2013 and 2016, where he made a total of 71 appearances and scored 4 goals.

Pratzner signed with United Soccer League club Rochester Rhinos on March 29, 2017.

On March 7, 2018, following the announcement that Rochester would be on hiatus for the 2018 season, Pratzner (along with many of his teammates) signed with Pittsburgh Riverhounds SC.

Pratzner joined USL Championship side Memphis 901 on December 14, 2018, ahead of their inaugural season.

On September 18, 2019, Pratzner returned to Pittsburgh Riverhounds for the remainder of the season. Pratzner left Pittsburgh at the end of the season.

References

External links

 
 Todd Pratzner's biography at Pittsburgh Riverhounds

Living people
1994 births
American soccer players
Soccer players from Pennsylvania
Sportspeople from Lancaster, Pennsylvania
Association football defenders
Xavier Musketeers men's soccer players
Rochester New York FC players
Pittsburgh Riverhounds SC players
Memphis 901 FC players
USL League Two players
USL Championship players